Mike Kowalski (born July 28, 1944) is an American drummer, percussionist and musicologist. He is best known as a longtime touring and session drummer for the rock band the Beach Boys.

Early career
Mike Kowalski was born in Hollywood, Los Angeles, California. He started singing and playing piano at the age of three. His first professional engagement was playing boogie-woogie piano with Mel Torme on drums for a television pilot at the age of five, filmed on location at Bimbo's 365 Club in San Francisco. At age ten, he was given a set of Slingerland Radio-King drums by actor Jack Webb of Dragnet, a noted jazz aficionado.

At the age of fifteen, he was playing drums professionally with various local rock and rhythm and blues bands. He performed both on stage and on screen as his family was affiliated with the film and television industries. By age nineteen he was playing drums with Los Angeles-based singers Pat and Lolly Vegas, whom later formed the pop/rock group Redbone. Also during this time, Kowalski performed and recorded with Sonny & Cher, Little Anthony & the Imperials and Etta James.

Kowalski, along with the Vegas Brothers and several players from The Wrecking Crew, recorded "Laugh At Me", Sonny Bono's only hit song as a solo artist. Produced by Bono and Snuff Garrett, the song reached the Top 10 in the US, UK, and Canada in August 1965. At age 21, Kowalski was the drummer on the record.

On January 3, 1968, Kowalski flew to London to join guitarist Ed Carter's blues rock band, The New Nadir, with Gary Thain on bass. Over the next several months, The New Nadir performed regularly on the city's club circuit. The trio shared the bill at the Marquee Club with Jethro Tull, Ten Years After, The Nice, the Aynsley Dunbar Retaliation, and the Jeff Beck Group, to name a few. A highlight for Kowalski was at the Speakeasy, when a friend of Carter's sat in with the band. That friend was Jimi Hendrix.

In March, producer Joe Boyd signed The New Nadir to his production company, Witchseason Productions. The New Nadir recorded three songs for Boyd, written by Carter and Peter Dawkins. In May, the group disbanded. Kowalski and Carter returned to Los Angeles, while Thain remained in London, eventually gaining recognition with Keef Hartley and Uriah Heep.

In the winter of 1969, Kowalski and Carter returned to London to fulfill their contract to Witchseason Productions. The album they recorded reflects and combines their passion for Latin jazz, rock and country music.

During this period, Kowalski drummed on albums by John Martyn, Beverley Martyn, Dudu Pukwana, Mike Heron and Nick Drake; all of the aforementioned were signed to Witchseason Productions.

In 1968, Kowalski met Dawn Aston from Kent, England. They were married in California in 1969.

The Beach Boys and The Backsters
In mid-June 1968, the Beach Boys were in the process of adding rhythm and horn sections for their upcoming summer tour. Auditions were held in the afternoon in Hollywood at the Moulin Rouge Supper Club on Sunset Boulevard. Bruce Johnston suggested Ed Carter for bass and guitar, Doug Dragon for keyboards, and Kowalski for percussion and drums. The three auditioned and were hired.

In November, Kowalski was called into the studio to play drums on Dennis Wilson's "All I Want to Do". Primarily written and produced by Wilson (with lyrics from poet and band associate Stephen Kalinich), the song was released on 20/20 (1969).

After briefly touring with the group as a percussionist in 1968, Kowalski played his first show on drums at the Big Sur Folk Festival in Monterey, California on October 3, 1970, filling in for Wilson, who was then filming Monte Hellman's Two-Lane Blacktop (1971).

In 1971, Kowalski was again on drums as the Beach Boys performed a slot at the invitation-only closing night of New York City's Fillmore East on June 27 and filmed the NBC special Good Vibrations From Central Park on July 2. Wilson was unable to play drums at both concerts because of a recent hand injury, although he continued to sing and play keyboards.

After the Central Park show, the Beach Boys flew back to Los Angeles. The next day, Kowalski was on a plane to Tokyo, playing drums with The Johnny Otis Show on a tour of the Far East. He would continue to perform with Otis from 1971 to 1974, juggling dates between both bands until 1973.

Several years later, Kowalski rejoined the Beach Boys touring band from 1977 to 1978, sharing drumming responsibilities with Dennis Wilson. He also performed in Celebration, a Mike Love-led side project with other prominent members of the touring band. During this period, he appeared on The Beach Boys M.I.U. Album, Celebration's Almost Summer and jazz tenor saxophonist Charles Lloyd's Weavings.

In October 1981, Wilson and percussionist Bobby Figueroa were unable to tour. Kowalski, after a three-year absence from the band, returned to play drums. By the end of the year, Kowalski and Wilson, who was back on drums, performed during the band's controversial holiday engagement in apartheid-era Sun City, South Africa. 1982 had Kowalski playing drums for Mike Love's Endless Summer Beach Band (featuring Dean Torrence), and drums and percussion with The Beach Boys. By March 1983, there were two sets of drums on stage; both Kowalski and Wilson played shows together until Wilson's death on December 28, 1983.

For the next 23 years, Kowalski would tour exclusively with The Beach Boys, playing drums until he parted ways with them in September 2007.

In 1984, Kowalski collaborated with Joel Peskin to create The Backsters. They were signed to A & M Records with Herb Alpert as executive producer. Their album, entitled Get on Your Back, featured many seasoned jazz and blues players. Released in early 1985, their first single was "Handclappin".

Other bands and performers
Kowalski has played with numerous bands and performers; both as a member of the group and as a session musician. Acts Kowalski has played with include:

Discography
A brief list of bands and musicians Kowalski has played with:
Pat and Lolly Vegas at the Haunted House (1965) - Pat and Lolly Vegas
Louisiana Fog (1968) - Charlie Musselwhite
20/20 (1969) - The Beach BoysLive in London (1969) - The Beach BoysThe Road to Ruin (1970) - John & Beverley MartynRagtime Cowboy Jew (1970) - Stefan GrossmanBryter Layter (1970) - Nick DrakeFreedom Flight (1971) - Shuggie OtisSmiling Men with Bad Reputations (1971) - Mike HeronSurf's Up (1971) - The Beach BoysThe Beach Boys in Concert (1973) - The Beach BoysM.I.U. Album (1978) - The Beach BoysCrazy Moon (1978) - Crazy HorseSurvivor (1978) - Barry MannAlmost Summer Soundtrack (1978) - CelebrationWeavings (1978) - Charles LloydGet On Your Back (1984) - The BackstersStill Cruisin' (1989) - The Beach BoysLive & Jumpin' (1997) - The BackstersSymphonic Sounds: Music of the Beach Boys (1998) - Royal Philharmonic OrchestraGarden State (2004) - Movie, Various ArtistsA Postcard From California (2011) - Al JardineMade in California'' (2013) - The Beach Boys

References

External links

Mike Kowalski "Big Beat Man"  official website
The book Fifty Sides of the Beach Boys
VIDEO - The Beach Boys with Mike Kowalski on Drums

1944 births
Living people
American rock drummers
People from Hollywood, Los Angeles
The Beach Boys backing band members
Surf musicians
20th-century American drummers
American male drummers
The Avantis members
20th-century American male musicians